The Cimeta Bridge (Jembatan Cimeta in Indonesian) is a horseshoe-shaped railway bridge in Padalarang, West Java, Indonesia. It passes over the Ciherang River.

The bridge was built during the Dutch colonial era.

References

External links
 Video showing a modern train crossing the bridge (second part of the video)

Rail infrastructure in Indonesia